Louis Marcus HRHA (born 1936) is an Irish documentarian.

Early life
Louis Marcus was born to an Irish Jewish family in Cork City in 1936. His brother David Marcus (1924–2009) was a writer. Their grandfather, Louis Roseberg, arrived in Cobh, County Cork in 1882, from Akmenė (Akmian) fleeing persecution in the Russian Empire.

Career
Marcus won the Silver Bear for Best Short Film for Fleá Ceoil at the 1967 Berlin International Film Festival.

Children at Work was nominated for the Academy Award for Best Documentary (Short Subject) at the 46th Academy Awards(1974), while Conquest of Light was nominated for the Academy Award for Best Live Action Short Film at the 48th Academy Awards(1976).

He is a member of Aosdána and an honorary member of the Royal Hibernian Academy.

Personal life
His sons Shimmy Marcus and Joe Marcus are also filmmakers.

References

External links 

Irish documentary filmmakers
Documentary film producers
Living people
Irish documentary film directors
Irish Jews
Irish people of Lithuanian-Jewish descent
Aosdána members
1936 births
People from Cork (city)